Justin Jackson may refer to:

Justin Jackson (American football) (born 1996), American football player
Justin Jackson (basketball, born 1990), American basketball player who went to college at Cincinnati
Justin Jackson (basketball, born 1995), American basketball player in the NBA who went to college at North Carolina
Justin Jackson (basketball, born 1997), Canadian basketball player who went to college at Maryland
Justin Jackson (footballer) (born 1974), English footballer